Lee Server (May 27, 1953 – December 28, 2021) was an American writer.  He was a graduate of New York University Film School. Server wrote several books about Hollywood cinema and pulp fiction. His book on Ava Gardner, Love is Nothing (2006) was described as an "excellent biography" by Peter Bogdanovich. On March 20, 2019, Server joined George Noory on the Coast to Coast radio program to discuss his most recent book, Handsome Johnny: The Life and Death of Johnny Rosselli: Gentleman Gangster, Hollywood Producer, CIA Assassin.

Personal life
Lee Server was born on May 27, 1953, in Springfield, Massachusetts. He was married to Terri Hardin. Server died on December 28, 2021, in Palm Springs, California, at the age of 68.

Books
Handsome Johnny: The Life and Death of Johnny Rosselli: Gentleman Gangster, Hollywood Producer, CIA Assassin (2018) 
Ava Gardner: "Love is Nothing" (2006)
Encyclopedia of Pulp Fiction Writers (2002)
 Robert Mitchum: "Baby, I Don't Care" (2001)
 Encyclopedia of Pulp Fiction Writers (2001) 
 Asian Pop Cinema: Bombay to Tokyo (1999)
 The Big Book of Noir (1998)
 Over My Dead Body: The Sensational Age of the American Paperback: 1945-1955  (1994)
 Sam Fuller: Film is a Battleground: A Critical Study, with Interviews, A Filmography, and a Bibliography (1994)
 Danger is My Business: An Illustrated History of the Fabulous Pulp Magazines: 1896-1953  (1993)
 Screenwriter: Words Become Pictures (1987)

References

External links
The Big Chat, Interview Series, Interview with: Lee Server
Profile by Esther Cross, "Cuentame tu Vida", Buenos Aires 
NY Times Book Review, review by Peter Bogdanovich 
Lee Server Interviewed at Silver Screen Oasis 

1953 births
2021 deaths
American male writers
Tisch School of the Arts alumni